Jeff Kiteley (born 7 September 1937) is a former  Australian rules footballer who played with South Melbourne in the Victorian Football League (VFL).

Notes

External links 

Living people
1937 births
Australian rules footballers from Victoria (Australia)
Sydney Swans players
Ormond Amateur Football Club players